Yang Jian (born 10 June 1994) is a Chinese diver. 

Yang started practicing gymnastics on his parents' will at age of 4, and 5 years later took up diving. His desire for risky jumps quickly brought him the nickname “King of Difficulty” amongst teammates. He won gold in the 10m platform event at the 2014 FINA Diving World Cup. Shortly after his international debut, he became the first one in history to accomplish a dive with difficulty of 4.1 since the regulation was introduced and set a world record for a single jump to 123 points. But in the following year, Yang finished his first tour to the world championships due to knee injury with the unexpected 10th place. Another right heel injury during training in November 2018 forced him to take surgery and rest for a month. In 2021, Yang won a silver medal in the 10m platform event at the 2020 Summer Olympics in Tokyo.

References

External links

Chinese male divers
1994 births
Living people
Asian Games medalists in diving
Divers at the 2014 Asian Games
Divers at the 2018 Asian Games
Asian Games gold medalists for China
Asian Games silver medalists for China
Medalists at the 2014 Asian Games
Medalists at the 2018 Asian Games
World Aquatics Championships medalists in diving
Sportspeople from Sichuan
Olympic divers of China
Divers at the 2020 Summer Olympics
Medalists at the 2020 Summer Olympics
Olympic silver medalists for China
Olympic medalists in diving
20th-century Chinese people
21st-century Chinese people